Ndew Niang (born 20 August 1954) is a Senegalese middle-distance runner. She competed in the women's 800 metres at the 1976 Summer Olympics. She was the first woman to represent Senegal at the Olympics.

Niang was also a footballer, and was captain of the Gazelles club of Dakar, the leading women's team in Senegal. In September 1977, she was signed by the French professional club Red Star de Champigny Cœully; a few days earlier, she had won the 1500 metres gold medal at the West African Games in Lagos.

References

1954 births
Living people
Athletes (track and field) at the 1976 Summer Olympics
Senegalese female middle-distance runners
Olympic athletes of Senegal
Place of birth missing (living people)
Senegalese women's footballers
Women's association footballers not categorized by position